The following is a list of affiliates of The CW, which launched on September 18, 2006. The network is currently owned by a consortium of Nexstar Media Group, which owns a majority 75 percent stake, with Warner Bros. Discovery and Paramount Global, each with 12.5 percent interests. Nexstar and Paramount Global also own stations affiliated with the network.

The CW covers just over 98 percent of television homes in the United States, with over-the-air coverage in all of the top 100 Nielsen-ranked markets. Remaining markets include over-the-air and cable-only stations utilizing The CW Plus and its network; four markets (Glendive, Lima, Puerto Rico and the United States Virgin Islands) have no dedicated affiliate.

A blue background indicates a station transmitting in the ATSC 3.0 format over-the-air; details about the station's alternate availability in the original ATSC format are contained in its article.

Affiliate stations

Current affiliates

CW Sports-only affiliates 
Thirteen of The CW's regular affiliates have declined to carry the network's coverage of LIV Golf branded under the CW Sports banner, which – as weekend afternoon programming – is not specified, nor mandated, under the network's existing affiliation contracts. In all of the affected markets, the network has made secondary affiliation arrangements with other stations, several of which are owned by network majority owner Nexstar, including one former full-time CW affiliate, Chicago's WGN-TV. 

All but one of the affiliates declining coverage are owned by either CBS News and Stations (whose parent network is a rightsholder of the rival PGA Tour) or Tegna Inc. (which has not publicized its reasons for declining coverage). The remaining station, WCIU, is one of the two CW affiliates owned by Weigel Broadcasting, and may have declined coverage due to prior commitments to its existing schedule of syndicated programming and Illinois High School Association sports coverage; Weigel's other CW affiliate WCWW-LD South Bend is carrying coverage.

Former affiliates

See also 
  - Nielsen DMA rankings for 2010-11

Notes

ATSC 1.0 simulcasts

Operational agreements

References

External links
Official The CW local affiliate list

The CW
The CW
Affiliates